Queen Peak is a mountain on Vancouver Island, British Columbia, Canada, located  north of Gold River and  east of Victoria Peak.

See also
 List of mountains in Canada

References

Vancouver Island Ranges